The Canterbury Football Club is an Australian rules football club located in the Melbourne suburb of Canterbury. The club fields open-age teams in the Victorian Amateur Football Association.

History

Canterbury joined the Box Hill Reporter League in 1903 in that league's second year.  In 1925 the club joined the newly created Sub-Districts competition but the club struggled against stronger clubs so in 1932 it became one of the founders in the formation of the Eastern Suburban Football League. In 1963 the ESFL merged with the CODFL to form the SESFL, later renamed Southern Football League.

It transferred to the more geographically appropriate Eastern Football League however were mostly near the foot of the bottom division until the club decided to transfer to the VAFA in 2014.

Premierships
 1920, 1956, 1969, 1972, 1991, 2003, 2015

VFL/AFL players
 Bob Pratt – 
 Peter Curran – , 
 Luke Penny –

References

External links
 Official club site
 Official VAFA site

Victorian Amateur Football Association clubs
1881 establishments in Australia
Australian rules football clubs established in 1881
Australian rules football clubs in Melbourne
Sport in the City of Boroondara